Willem Gillisz Kool (1608 – 1666), was a Dutch Golden Age painter.

Biography
He was born in Haarlem and entered the Haarlem Guild of St. Luke in 1638. In the same year he married Cornelia van der Molen, daughter of Jan Gerritsen van der Molen, on 17 januari 1638. He is known for landscapes and died in Haarlem.

References

Willem Gillisz Kool on Artnet

1608 births
1666 deaths
Dutch Golden Age painters
Dutch male painters
Artists from Haarlem
Painters from Haarlem